"Search for the Hero" is a song by British dance music band M People, released in June 1995 as the third single (remixed) from their third album, Bizarre Fruit (1994). It is written by bandmembers Mike Pickering and Paul Heard, and produced by the band. The song peaked at number nine on the UK Singles Chart, number 13 on the UK Dance Singles Chart and number three on the UK R&B Singles Chart. Its accompanying music video was directed by Matthew Amos.

Background
There had been a four-and-a-half-month gap between their previous single "Open Your Heart" and this single's release.

Originally planned to be the second single, but delayed for a more radio-friendly single remix, "Search for the Hero" became one of the most familiar M People songs, responsible for propelling the parent album Bizarre Fruit back into the Top 10 in 1995 after having first charted at No. 4 from November 1994.

Chart performance

In June 1995, "Search for the Hero" continued the band's unbroken run of eight consecutive Top 10 singles, entering the chart and peaking at number nine. It had been expected to chart higher due to strong radio support, but it stayed in the Top 20 for three weeks like predecessor single: "Open Your Heart". The single dropped out of the top 40 after just five weeks. The two Bizarre Fruit singles "Open Your Heart" and "Search for the Hero" had been swapped by the record company because of the demand for dance music in 1995, so "Search for the Hero" was pushed to be the middle single scheduled for the summer as a precursor to their world tour.

The single sold 88,700 copies in its first week, almost as much as "Renaissance", which a year previously had sold 89,000 in its first week after charting higher at number five in February 1994.

Critical reception
William Cooper from AllMusic described the song as "jazzy" and picked it as one of the highlights from the Bizarre Fruit album. Another editor, Jon O'Brien, called it an "uplifting" anthem. Larry Flick from Billboard felt that it is an "optimistic pop/hip-hop number" and stated that Heather Small "continues to be a uniquely enchanting front woman, while her partners, Mike Pickering and Paul Heard, prove their mettle as tunesmiths who require attention beyond the parameters of nightclubs". Jeremy Biser from The Day said the track can "cure whatever ails the soul." Pan-European magazine Music & Media concluded that "water and fire can be friends after all. Musically big-voiced Ms Small does something inconceivable for many others, namely singing a soulful ballad on quite a heavy rhythm track." 

A reviewer from Music Week rated it three out of five, adding that "this laid back effort from Bizarre Fruit lacks the guts of its predecessors. Probably a hit, but certainly not their biggest." An editor, Alan Jones, deemed it one of the album's "better tracks", complimenting it as "superior and stately". He added that "the slower tempo suits Heather Small much better and the loose feel of the track is pleasing." People Magazine noted its "feel-good mantra" and stated that Small's "booming alto is hard to shake and, like her pineapple-shaped coif, impossible to ignore." James Hamilton from the RM Dance Update called it a "change of pace attractive sultry swayer". Wayne Bledsoe from Scripps Howard commented that "the cavernous acoustics on the intro to "Search for the Hero" sound like a chopper landing in a field." He also remarked that Small's "commanding tone matches the grandiosity" of the intro.

Airplay
Airplay for the single began five weeks before retail release, entering at number 45 and moving to 31 to 23 to 18 and then to number 15 in its first retail week. Unlike its sales, "Search for the Hero"'s airplay peaked at number 5, where it stayed for two weeks and did not leave the Airplay Top 40 for 13 weeks.

In May 1996, almost a year after release "Search for the Hero" re-entered the airplay chart at number 33 and climbed for five consecutive weeks to peak at number 20. This is therefore one of two singles in the '90s apart from Robbie Williams's "Angels" and Ultra Naté's "Free" to do so , possibly prompted by the song's use in a Peugeot 406 advert that same year.

Music video
The accompanying music video for "Search for the Hero" was directed by Matthew Amos. The video was shot in early May 1995 in and around the iconic Battersea Power Station in South London on the still disused site with special flame effects and Heather at the forefront with the band playing behind her. A triptych of images are detailed with DNA formulae, people in busy places and body statistics make up this image and foundation of life. Children are also seen running free and playing in the desecration and dilapidation of broken down cars, bricks, mortar, fire and flames.

The whole line up of the band are seen as well as, on drums Andy Gangadeen, Lynieve Austin and Paul Johnson performing on backing vocals within the shell of the Power Station drums. The other images seen are of exploding cars, kids playing on wasteland, smashing glasses bottles and CCTV footage. There are two poignant images in the video are the dolls head falling to the ground and the child swing from the hanging rope noose.

Remixes
Unusually for an M People single, mixes of the single were heavily R&B and not dance-orientated and were provided by Smith & Mighty. They serviced two mixes of the single in the form of a laid back R&B groove, the "Searchin Mix" and a dub of the same remix. The other mix is from producers Blacksmith with their "Mellow Flava Mix". The final track on the single is a live performance recorded in Germany on the Bizarre Fruit Tour earlier in 1995.

Track listings
 Cassette
 12" maxi
 "Search for the Hero" (Smith & Mighty Searchin Mix)
 "Search for the Hero" (Smith & Mighty Searchin Dub)
 "Search for the Hero" (Blacksmith Mellow Flava Mix)
 "Search for the Hero" (Master Mix)

 CD maxi
 "Search for the Hero" (Radio mix)
 "Search for the Hero" (Smith & Mighty Searchin Mix)
 "Search for the Hero" (Smith & Mighty Searchin Dub)
 "Search for the Hero" (Blacksmith Mellow Flava Mix)
 "Search for the Hero" (Live Mix)

Charts

In popular culture
In 1996, one year after its release, "Search for the Hero" was used as the background music in a Peugeot 406 television advert. The advert debuted during ITV’s News at Ten, taking up the entire three-minute commercial break. The commercial combined the song with a series of surreal and controversial images, from a wildlife photographer interacting with an elephant to a child narrowly avoiding being hit by a car, and saw the brand replace its former tagline: "The lion goes from strength to strength" to "The drive of your life".

During the 2020 Conservative Party Conference, Prime Minister Boris Johnson urged people to "search for the hero inside yourself" when discussing the need to maintain a healthy weight during the coronavirus pandemic.

References

1995 singles
1995 songs
BMG Rights Management singles
M People songs
RCA Records singles
Songs written by Mike Pickering
Songs written by Paul Heard